The Twenty-One Demands was a set of demands made during the First World War by the Empire of Japan under Prime Minister Ōkuma Shigenobu to the government of the Republic of China on 18 January 1915. The secret demands would greatly extend Japanese control of China. Japan would keep the former German areas it had conquered at the start of World War I in 1914. It would be strong in Manchuria and South Mongolia. It would have an expanded role in railways.  The most extreme demands (in section 5) would give Japan a decisive voice in finance, policing, and government affairs. The last part would make China in effect a protectorate of Japan, and thereby reduce Western influence. Japan was in a strong position, as the Western powers were in a stalemated world war with Germany. Britain and Japan had a military alliance since 1902, and in 1914 London had asked Tokyo to enter the war.  Beijing published the secret demands and appealed to Washington and London. They were sympathetic and forced Tokyo to drop section 5. In the final 1916 settlement, Japan gave up its fifth set of demands. It gained a little in China, but lost a great deal of prestige and trust in Britain and the U.S.

The Chinese public responded with a spontaneous nationwide boycott of Japanese goods; Japan's exports to China fell drastically. Britain was affronted and no longer trusted Japan as an ally. With the First World War underway, Japan's position was strong and Britain's was weak; nevertheless, Britain (and the United States) forced Japan to drop the fifth set of demands that would have given Japan a large measure of control over the entire Chinese economy and ended the Open Door Policy. Japan and China reached a series of agreements which ratified the first four sets of goals on 25 May 1915.

Background 

Japan had gained a large sphere of influence in northern China and Manchuria through its victories in the First Sino-Japanese War and the Russo-Japanese War, and had thus joined the ranks of the European imperialist powers in their scramble to establish political and economic domination over Imperial China under the Qing dynasty. With the overthrow of the Qing dynasty in the Xinhai Revolution, and the subsequent establishment of the new Republic of China, Japan saw an opportunity to further expand its position in China.

The German Empire was in control of Shandong province as part of the Kiautschou Bay concession since 1898. With the onset of the First World War, Japan declared war against Germany on 23 August 1914. Japanese and British forces quickly seized all German holdings in the Far East, after the Siege of Tsingtao.

Initial negotiations 

Japan, under Prime Minister Ōkuma Shigenobu and Foreign Minister Katō Takaaki, drafted the initial list of Twenty-One Demands, which were reviewed by the genrō and Emperor Taishō, and approved by the Diet. Ambassador Hioki Eki delivered the list to President Yuan Shikai of the Beiyang government in a private audience on 18 January 1915, with warnings of dire consequences if China were to reject them.

The Twenty One Demands were divided into five groups:

 Group 1 (four demands) confirmed Japan's recent seizure of German ports and operations in Shandong Province, and expanded Japan's sphere of influence over the railways, coasts and major cities of the province.
 Group 2 (seven demands) pertained to Japan's South Manchuria Railway Zone, extending the leasehold over the territory for 99 years, and expanding Japan's sphere of influence in southern Manchuria and eastern Inner Mongolia, to include rights of settlement and extraterritoriality, appointment of financial and administrative officials to the government and priority for Japanese investments in those areas.  Japan demanded access to Inner Mongolia for raw materials, as a manufacturing site, and as a strategic buffer against Russian encroachment in Korea. 
 Group 3 (two demands) gave Japan control of the Han-Ye-Ping (Hanyang, Daye, and Pingxiang) mining and metallurgical complex in central China; it was deep in debt to Japan.  
 Group 4 (one demand) barred China from giving any further coastal or island concessions to foreign powers.
 Group 5 (seven demands) was the most aggressive. China was to hire Japanese advisors who could take effective control of China's finance and police. Japan would be empowered to build three major railways, and also Buddhist temples and schools. Japan would gain effective control of Fujian, across the Taiwan Strait from Taiwan, which had been ceded to Japan in 1895.

Knowing the negative reaction "Group 5" would cause, Japan initially tried to keep its contents secret. The Chinese government attempted to stall for as long as possible and leaked the full contents of the Twenty-One Demands to European powers in the hope that due to a perceived threat to their own political and economic spheres of interest, they would help contain Japan.

Japanese ultimatum 
After China rejected Japan's revised proposal on 26 April 1915, the genrō  intervened and deleted ‘Group 5’ from the document, as these had proved to be the most objectionable to the Chinese government. A reduced set of "Thirteen Demands" was transmitted on May 7 in the form of an ultimatum, with a two-day deadline for response. Yuan Shikai, competing with other local warlords to become the ruler of all China, was not in a position to risk war with Japan, and accepted appeasement, a tactic followed by his successors. The final form of the treaty was signed by both parties on May 25, 1915.

Katō Takaaki publicly admitted that the ultimatum was invited by Yuan to save face with the Chinese people in conceding to the Demands. American Minister Paul Reinsch reported to the US State Department that the Chinese were surprised at the leniency of the ultimatum, as it demanded much less than they had already committed themselves to concede.

Consequences 

The results of the revised final (Thirteen Demands) version of the Twenty-One Demands were far more negative for Japan than positive. Without "Group 5", the new treaty gave Japan little more than it already had in China.

On the other hand, the United States expressed strongly negative reactions to Japan's rejection of the Open Door Policy. In the Bryan Note issued by Secretary of State William Jennings Bryan on 13 March 1915, the U.S., while affirming Japan's "special interests" in Manchuria, Mongolia and Shandong, expressed concern over further encroachments to Chinese sovereignty.

Great Britain, Japan's closest ally, expressed concern over what was perceived as Japan's overbearing, bullying approach to diplomacy, and the British Foreign Office in particular was unhappy with Japanese attempts to establish what would effectively be a Japanese protectorate over all of China.

Afterwards, Japan and the United States looked for a compromise; as a result, the Lansing–Ishii Agreement was concluded in 1917. It was approved by the Paris Peace Conference in 1919.

In China, the overall political impact of Japan's actions was highly negative, creating a considerable amount of public ill-will towards Japan, contributing to the May Fourth Movement, and a significant upsurge in nationalism.

Japan continued to push for outright control over Shandong Province and won European diplomatic recognition for their claim at the Treaty of Versailles (despite the refusal of the Chinese delegation to sign the treaty). This, in turn, provoked ill-will from the United States government, as well as widespread hostility within China; a large-scale boycott against Japanese goods was just one effect. In 1922, the U.S. brokered a solution: China was awarded nominal sovereignty over all of Shandong, while in practice Japan's economic dominance continued.

See also 
 History of the Republic of China
 Warlord Era
 Unequal treaties
 Japanese imperialism

References

Bibliography 
 Akagi, Roy Hidemichi. Japan Foreign Relations 1542–1936 (1936) pp 332–364.online 
 Bix, Herbert P. "Japanese Imperialism and the Manchurian Economy, 1900–31." China Quarterly  (1972): 425–443 online
 Clubb, O. Edmund. 20th century China (1965) online pp 52–55. 86
 Davis, Clarence B. "Limits of Effacement: Britain and the Problem of American Cooperation and Competition in China, 1915–1917." Pacific Historical Review (1979): 47–63. 
 Dickinson, Frederick R. War and national reinvention: Japan in the Great War, 1914–1919 (Harvard U. Asia Center, Vol. 177. 1999)
 Dull, Paul S. “Count Kato Komei and the Twenty-One Demands.” Pacific Historical Review 19#2 (1950), pp. 151–161. online
 Duus, Peter et al. eds. The Japanese informal empire in China, 1895–1937 (1989) online
 Gowen, Robert Joseph. "Great Britain and the Twenty-One Demands of 1915: Cooperation versus Effacement," Journal of Modern History (1971) 43#1 pp. 76–106 in JSTOR
 Griswold, A. Whitney. The Far Eastern Policy of the United States (1938) 

  Hinsley, F. H. ed. British Foreign Policy under Sir Edward Grey (1977) pp 452–465.
 Jansen, Marius B. "Yawata, Hanyehping, and the twenty-one demands," Pacific Historical Review(1954) 23#1 pp 31–48.
 LaFeber, Walter. The Clash: US-Japanese Relations Throughout History (1998) pp 106–16.
 Link, Arthur S. Wilson, Volume III: The Struggle for Neutrality, 1914–1915 (1960) pp 267–308, on the American role.
 Luo, Zhitian. "National humiliation and national assertion-The Chinese response to the twenty-one demands" Modern Asian Studies (1993) 27#2 pp 297–319 online.
Narangoa, Li. "Japanese Geopolitics and the Mongol Lands, 1915–1945," European Journal of East Asian Studies (2004) 3#1 pp 45–67
 Nish, Ian Hill. Japanese foreign policy, 1869–1942: Kasumigaseki to Miyakezaka (1977).
  Wood, G. Zay. The twenty-one demands, Japan versus China (1921) online

1915 in China
1915 in Japan
1915 in international relations
China–Japan relations
Treaties concluded in 1915
Treaties of the Empire of Japan
Treaties of the Republic of China (1912–1949)
Ultimata
Unequal treaties
Warlord Era
China–Japan treaties